Swati Maria Saini, popularly known as Mia Saini, is a financial journalist and video host who has also interned for CNBC and worked as a freelance reporter for TheStreet.com. She is currently a Hong Kong-based reporter for Bloomberg Television, having joined the network in June 2011, and covers business, economics, and global markets. As of December 2014, she was listed as a former reporter on the Bloomberg terminal system. Previously she was an anchor/reporter for Forbes Video Network, covering markets, business, economic and political news, and a video host for MBA Pod TV on www.MBAPodcaster.com 

Prior to Harvard Business School she worked on the trading floor at Goldman Sachs and as a freelance TV reporter for Jim Cramer's website, TheStreet.com. 
She is an alumna of Massachusetts Institute of Technology (MIT) and has an MBA from Harvard Business School (HBS).  Mia writes her own column "Money with Mia" for HBS's newspaper Harbus and has interviewed numerous CEOS and money managers including President of BlackRock, President of Lloyds, and Former Merrill Lynch CEO, John Thain. She also anchors  HBS TV Market Minute with Mia Saini , now called H-Biz Tonight which features short daily reports from the financial markets 

Mia has won numerous awards including being chosen as a Truman Scholar recipient, and as Glamour Magazine's Top 10 College Woman, winning the 1st place prize for community service. She is originally from Tracy, California.

References

External links
http://www.harbus.org/2009/Where-in-the-World-4625/
https://web.archive.org/web/20091106022443/http://hutvnetwork.com/shows/hbiztonight/video/hbs-tv-market-minute-with-mia-saini-1121
https://web.archive.org/web/20091006233212/http://mitsloan.mit.edu/women/alumni.php
http://institutionalmemory.hbs.edu/memories/mia_saini_story.html
https://news.yahoo.com/s/prweb/20091028/bs_prweb/prweb3117134
http://truman.gov/meet-our-scholars/meet-our-scholars-detail?ScholarUserId=ebd787c6-5202-4a39-9132-40d2785ecb13
http://www.wallstreetoasis.com/video/hbs-tv-market-minute-with-mia-saini-0
https://web.archive.org/web/20100106115112/http://mbapodcaster.com/video-podcasts.asp

American people of Punjabi descent
American television journalists
CNBC people
Massachusetts Institute of Technology alumni
Harvard Business School alumni
American women journalists
American writers of Indian descent
Living people
Year of birth missing (living people)
Goldman Sachs people
People from Los Angeles
Journalists from California
21st-century American women